Dimner Beeber Middle School was a historic middle school located in the Wynnefield neighborhood of Philadelphia, Pennsylvania. It is part of the School District of Philadelphia. The building was designed by Irwin T. Catharine and built in 1931–1932. It is a three-story, 15 bay, brick building on a stone basement in the Classical Revival-style. It features a projecting center section and projecting end bays, projecting brick pilasters with stone bases and caps, moulded cornice, and balustraded parapet.

The building was added to the National Register of Historic Places in 1988.

Since 2013, the building has been shared with the Science Leadership Academy at Beeber, the second branch of the Science Leadership Academy. The high school focuses on science and technology.

References

External links
Dimner Beeber Middle School
Science Leadership Academy at Beeber

School buildings on the National Register of Historic Places in Philadelphia
Neoclassical architecture in Pennsylvania
School buildings completed in 1932
School District of Philadelphia
West Philadelphia
Public middle schools in Pennsylvania
1932 establishments in Pennsylvania